Below are lists of people killed by law enforcement in the United States, both on duty and off duty.

Lists of killings
The numbers show how many total killings per year are recorded in the linked lists, not the actual number of people killed by law enforcement.  The listing documents the occurrence of a death, making no implications regarding wrongdoing or justification on the part of the person killed or officer involved.

See also

Death in custody § United States
 Henry A. Wallace Police Crime Public Database
List of cases of police brutality
List of countries with annual rates and counts for killings by law enforcement officers
List of law enforcement officers killed in the line of duty in the United States
List of law enforcement officers convicted for an on-duty killing in the United States
List of police reforms related to the George Floyd protests
List of unarmed African Americans killed by law enforcement officers in the United States
Lists of killings by law enforcement officers
Lists of killings by law enforcement officers in the United States
Police brutality in the United States
Police misconduct § United States
Police riot § United States
Police use of deadly force in the United States

References

External links
 Fatal Encounters Dot Org National Database of People Killed While Encountering Police. Fatal Encounters.
 The Counted: Tracking people killed by police in the United States 2015–2016. The Guardian.
 Washington Post database of police shootings, 2015–present. The Washington Post.
 US police killings undercounted by half, study using Guardian data finds – The Guardian. 11 October 2017.
 National Gun Violence Memorial with searchable database of Americans killed with guns. GunMemorial.
 database of police killings in the U.S. 2013–2020. Mapping Police Violence.

 
Police brutality in the United States
People killed by law enforcement officers